Alois Szilagyi (1901 – 1965) was a Romanian football defender. Alois Szilagyi played in the first official match of Romania's national team at the 1922 King Alexander's Cup, against Yugoslavia, which ended with a 2–1 victory.

References

External links
 

1901 births
1965 deaths
Romanian footballers
Romania international footballers
Place of birth missing
Association football defenders
Liga I players